Dairy is a significant part of the agricultural output of the state of California. California ranks first out of the fifty states in dairy production. The state has about 1,300 dairy farms and 1.727 million dairy cows. The state produces nearly 20 percent of all U.S. milk.

History

The first cows were brought to California by the Spanish. The cows provided them a source of meat and milk to make butter.

The Inland Empire, formerly one of California's largest areas for dairy farming, has lost a significant amount of land to real estate development.

In 2011, PETA sued California agriculture officials and the California Milk Advisory Board for what they claimed was a false and misleading "Happy Cows" ad campaign.

In 2018, the Trump trade war led China to put retaliatory tariffs on US dairy products. This led to major losses among California dairy farmers.

Notes 

Milk
Economy of California
Agriculture in California
Dairy farming in the United States